KAMA (750 AM) is a radio station broadcasting a Spanish News/Talk format. Licensed to El Paso, Texas, United States, the station serves the El Paso area. The station is currently owned by 97.5 Licensee TX, LLC, an American subsidiary of Grupo Radio Centro.

The nighttime signal of KAMA reduces power to 1 kilowatt and becomes highly directional to the west in order to protect the skywave signal of WSB in Atlanta.  750 AM is a United States and Canadian clear-channel frequency; WSB is a Class A dominant station on this frequency.  CBGY is the Canadian Class A station on 750 AM.

History
The station went on the air as KEPB on April 18, 1985, promptly taking the current KAMA calls on July 11. It took over the intellectual property of KAMA, which had been at 1060 (now KXPL) and aired a Spanish-language format with a heritage stretching to Juárez's XELO-AM. The move to 750 allowed KAMA to stop being a daytimer and created a new station, KFNA, at 1060.

The station was sold to Tichenor Media, operator of longtime rival KBNA, in 1994. Tichenor merged into Heftel Broadcasting in 1997, changed name to Hispanic Broadcasting Corp in 2000, and merged into Univision Communications in 2003.

For a time, beginning in 2012, KAMA was the El Paso outlet for the Univision America talk network, a format later moved to sister KQBU at 920 AM.

In 2016, Univision Radio exited El Paso by selling its stations to affiliates of Mexican radio broadcaster Grupo Radio Centro for $2 million, with GRC taking over operations via LMA on November 8. Rafael Márquez, a United States citizen, owns 75 percent of the licensee, 97.5 Licensee TX, LLC, with the remainder being owned by Grupo Radio Centro TX, LLC.

References

External links

AMA
Radio stations established in 1985
AMA
News and talk radio stations in the United States
Grupo Radio Centro
1985 establishments in Texas